Marcelo Gismondi (born 20 February 1953) is an Argentine rower. He competed in the men's coxless four event at the 1976 Summer Olympics.

References

1953 births
Living people
Argentine male rowers
Olympic rowers of Argentina
Rowers at the 1976 Summer Olympics
Place of birth missing (living people)